Arnold Hörburger (February 17, 1886, Rotterdam – February 20, 1966) was a Dutch amateur football (soccer) player.

He was a part of the Dutch Olympic team, which won the bronze medal in the 1912 tournament. Due to being a reserve player, he did not play in a match and was not awarded with a medal.

External links

1886 births
1966 deaths
Dutch footballers
Olympic footballers of the Netherlands
Footballers at the 1912 Summer Olympics
Footballers from Rotterdam
Netherlands international footballers
Association football midfielders